Wiki Server was a set of services which have shipped with all versions of Mac OS X Server since v10.5 until macOS High Sierra. Mac OS X Server includes web-based Wiki, Weblog, Calendaring, and Contact services. Additionally, it includes a Cocoa application called Directory which allows directory viewing as well as enabling of group services.

Server 5.7.1, the version aligned with macOS 10.14 and released on September 30, 2018, removed the Wiki Server functionality from Server.app.

2007 software
Proprietary wiki software
Apple Inc. software
MacOS Server
MacOS-only software made by Apple Inc.